Wolfgang Grönebaum (14 March 1927 – 16 March 1998) was a German actor. He appeared in 26 films and television shows between 1968 and 1998.

Selected filmography
 The Willi Busch Report (1979)
 Entführung aus der Lindenstraße (1995)

External links

1927 births
1998 deaths
German male film actors
German male television actors
20th-century German male actors